Arthur Sampson Napier  (1853–1916) was a British philologist. He was Merton Professor of English Language and Literature, University of Oxford, from 1885 and also Rawlinsonian Professor of Anglo-Saxon since 1903. Napier was appointed a fellow of Merton College, Oxford, in 1885 and of the British Academy in 1904.

Born in Wilmslow on 30 August 1853, Napier studied at Owens College, Exeter College, Oxford, and the University of Göttingen.

Napier was also an avid collector of the Oxford college stamp issues and gave talks and displays on this subject. He also wrote many articles for Gibbons Stamp Monthly on the college stamp issues. He was Vice President of the Oxford Philatelic Society from 1892 onwards.

Napier died on 10 May 1916.

References

Footnotes

Bibliography 

 
 
 
 

1853 births
1916 deaths
19th-century philologists
20th-century philologists
Alumni of Exeter College, Oxford
Alumni of the Victoria University of Manchester
British philologists
Fellows of Merton College, Oxford
Fellows of the British Academy
Linguists from the United Kingdom
Merton Professors of English Language and Literature
People from Wilmslow
Rawlinsonian Professors of Anglo-Saxon
University of Göttingen alumni
Writers from Cheshire